Abel Kay (1911–2004) was an Australian tennis player. He was renowned for his fitness and played several sports to a good standard. As a boxer he was Victorian amateur welterweight champion in 1931. He also played football and water polo. Entering the Australian Championships for the first time in 1933, Kay lost in round one to Wilmer Allison. The following year he lost his first match to Harry Lee in five sets.  In 1935 he lost his first match to Enrique Maier. In 1936 Kay reached the semi finals (beating Don Turnbull before losing to Jack Crawford).  The following year he lost to Vivian McGrath in the quarter finals. In 1939 he lost in round one to James Gilchrist.

Grand Slam finals

Mixed Doubles (1 runner-up)

References

1911 births
2004 deaths
Australian male tennis players
Tennis people from Victoria (Australia)
20th-century Australian people
People from Mitcham, Victoria